Sandra Kiriasis ( Prokoff; born 4 January 1975 in Dresden) is a German former bobsledder who has competed from 2000 to 2014.

At the 2002 Winter Olympics in Salt Lake City she won silver in the two-woman event together with teammate Ulrike Holzner. She also competed in the bobsleigh events at the 2006 Winter Olympics in Turin, where Kiriasis (married in late 2004) won gold in the two-woman event with teammate Anja Schneiderheinze. She finished fourth in the two-woman event at the 2010 Winter Olympics in Vancouver.

Kiriasis also won eight medals at the FIBT World Championships with five golds (Two-woman: 2005, 2007, 2008; Mixed team: 2007, 2008, 2009) and two silvers (Two-woman: 2003, 2004). She won the overall two-woman Bobsleigh World Cup in 2003-4, 2004–5, 2005–6, 2006-7, 2007-8, 2008-9, 2009–10, 2010–11 and won a record 43 World Cup races in total.

Kiriasis retired from the sport after the 2014 Winter Olympics. In July 2014 Kiriasis joined basketball team Nürnberger BC as a fitness coach. In 2017 she was appointed as driving coach for the Jamaican women's bobsleigh team ahead of the 2018 Winter Olympics in Pyeongchang, South Korea, helping them to qualify for the Olympics for the first time. However, she parted company with the Jamaica Bobsleigh Federation days ahead of the start of bobsleigh training at the Games after she was told she would be demoted from her position as driver coach to the role of track and performance analyst.

Career highlights

Olympic Winter Games
2002 – Salt Lake City,  2nd with Ulrike Holzner
2006 – Turin,  1st with Anja Schneiderheinze
2018 – PyeongChang, Former coach of the women's Jamaican bobsled team.
World Championships
2003 – Winterberg,  2nd with Ulrike Holzner
2004 – Königssee,  2nd with Anja Schneiderheinze
2005 – Calgary,  1st with Anja Schneiderheinze
2007 – St. Moritz,  1st with Romy Logsch
2008 – Altenberg,  1st with Romy Logsch
European Championships
2005 – Altenberg,  2nd with Anja Schneiderheinze
2006 – St. Moritz,  1st with Berit Wiacker
2007 – Cortina d'Ampezzo,  1st with Romy Logsch
2008 – Cesana,  1st with Berit Wiacker
2009 – St. Moritz,  1st with Berit Wiacker
World Cup Single Events
2000/2001 – Winterberg,  2nd with Daniela Clobes
2000/2001 – Winterberg,  3rd with Daniela Clobes
2000/2001 – Igls,  2nd with Kerstin Szymkowiak
2000/2001 – Igls,  2nd with Kerstin Szymkowiak
2000/2001 – Park City,  1st with Ulrike Holzner
2001/2002 – Winterberg,  1st with Ulrike Holzner
2001/2002 – Winterberg,  1st with Ulrike Holzner
2001/2002 – Königssee,  1st with Nicole Herschmann
2001/2002 – Igls,  1st with Ulrike Holzner
2001/2002 – Igls,  1st with Nicole Herschmann
2001/2002 – Calgary,  3rd with Ulrike Holzner
2001/2002 – Calgary,  3rd with Ulrike Holzner
2002/2003 – Calgary,  2nd with Ulrike Holzner
2002/2003 – Calgary,  1st with Ulrike Holzner
2002/2003 – Park City,  1st with Nicole Herschmann
2002/2003 – Park City,  1st with Ulrike Holzner
2002/2003 – Lake Placid,  1st with Ulrike Holzner
2002/2003 – Lake Placid,  1st with Nicole Herschmann
2002/2003 – Igls,  2nd with Nicole Herschmann
2002/2003 – Igls,  2nd with Ulrike Holzner
2003/2004 – Calgary,  1st with Anja Schneiderheinze
2003/2004 – Calgary,  1st with Janine Tischer
2003/2004 – Lake Placid,  1st with Anja Schneiderheinze
2003/2004 – Lake Placid,  2nd with Janine Tischer
2003/2004 – Lillehammer,  1st with Anja Schneiderheinze
2003/2004 – Lillehammer,  1st with Berit Wiacker
2004/2005 – Winterberg,  1st with Anja Schneiderheinze
2004/2005 – Altenberg,  2nd with Anja Schneiderheinze
2004/2005 – Igls,  1st with Berit Wiacker
2004/2005 – Cortina d'Ampezzo,  1st with Berit Wiacker
2004/2005 – Cesana,  1st with Berit Wiacker
2004/2005 – Lake Placid,  1st with Anja Schneiderheinze
2005/2006 – Calgary,  1st with Anja Schneiderheinze
2005/2006 – Lake Placid,  1st with Anja Schneiderheinze
2005/2006 – Igls,  1st with Berit Wiacker
2005/2006 – Cortina d'Ampezzo,  1st with Anja Schneiderheinze
2005/2006 – Königssee,  3rd with Anja Schneiderheinze
2005/2006 – St. Moritz,  2nd with Berit Wiacker
2006/2007 – Calgary,  3rd with Romy Logsch
2006/2007 – Lake Placid,  3rd with Anja Schneiderheinze
2006/2007 – Cortina d'Ampezzo,  1st with Romy Logsch
2006/2007 – Igls,  1st with Anja Schneiderheinze
2006/2007 – Cesana,  1st with Anja Schneiderheinze
2006/2007 – Winterberg,  1st with Romy Logsch
2006/2007 – Königssee,  1st with Berit Wiacker
2007/2008 – Calgary,  3rd with Berit Wiacker
2007/2008 – Park City,  1st with Romy Logsch
2007/2008 – Lake Placid,  1st with Romy Logsch
2007/2008 – Cortina d'Ampezzo,  1st with Romy Logsch
2007/2008 – Cesana,  3rd with Berit Wiacker
2007/2008 – St. Moritz,  1st with Romy Logsch
2007/2008 – Königssee,  2nd with Berit Wiacker
2007/2008 – Winterberg,  1st with Berit Wiacker
2008/2009 – Winterberg,  2nd with Romy Logsch
2008/2009 – Altenberg,  1st with Berit Wiacker
2008/2009 – Igls,  3rd with Romy Logsch
2008/2009 – Königssee,  2nd with Romy Logsch
2008/2009 – St. Moritz,  1st with Berit Wiacker
2008/2009 – St. Moritz,  1st with Berit Wiacker
2008/2009 – Park City,  3rd with Patricia Polifka

References

Bobsleigh two-woman Olympic medalists since 2002
Bobsleigh two-woman world championship medalists since 2000
Mixed bobsleigh-skeleton world championship medalists since 2007
List of two-woman bobsleigh World Cup champions since 1995
NBCOlympics.com profile

1975 births
Living people
German female bobsledders
Sportspeople from Dresden
Bobsledders at the 2002 Winter Olympics
Bobsledders at the 2006 Winter Olympics
Bobsledders at the 2010 Winter Olympics
Bobsledders at the 2014 Winter Olympics
Olympic bobsledders of Germany
Olympic gold medalists for Germany
Olympic silver medalists for Germany
Olympic medalists in bobsleigh
Medalists at the 2006 Winter Olympics
Medalists at the 2002 Winter Olympics
German sports coaches
Ich bin ein Star – Holt mich hier raus! participants